Polvijärvi (literally "knee lake") is a municipality of Finland. It is located in the North Karelia region. Neighbouring municipalities are Juuka, Kaavi, Kontiolahti, Liperi Outokumpu.

The municipality is unilingually Finnish.

Polvijärvi is established in 1876.

Notable people
 Heikki Soininen (1891–1957)
 Vilho Turunen (1923–1973)
 Jouni Kortelainen (born 1957)
 Annikka Mutanen (born 1965)

References

External links

Municipality of Polvijärvi – Official website

 
Populated places established in 1876
1876 establishments in Finland